Deh-e Kabud (also Romanized as Deh-e Kabūd and Deh Kabūd) is a village in Dorudfaraman Rural District, in the Central District of Kermanshah County, Kermanshah Province, Iran. At the 2006 census, its population was 433, in 96 families.

References 

Populated places in Kermanshah County